Odeon Theatre or Odeon Theater or Odéon Theatre may refer to:

Australia
Odeon Theatre in Norwood, South Australia, Australia
Odeon Theatre, Hobart, in Tasmania, Australia

Canada
Odeon Theatre Toronto, Canada
Odeon Theatre (Victoria, British Columbia), Canada

United States
Odeon Theater (Belview, Minnesota), listed on the National Register of Historic Places (NRHP) in Redwood County, Minnesota, U.S.
Odeon Theater (Tucumcari, New Mexico), U.S.
Odeon Theatre (Greensboro, North Carolina), U.S.
Odeon Theater (Mason, Texas), U.S.

Other countries
Odeon theater (Amman), in Jordan
Odeon Theatre (Bucharest), in Romania
Odeon Theatre, Christchurch, in New Zealand
Odéon-Théâtre de l'Europe, in Paris, France

See also
Coors Event Centre, formerly Odeon Events Centre, in Saskatoon, Canada (originally built as a theatre)
Former Odeon cinemas in Leeds, UK
Odeon Cinemas, a cinema chain
Odeon Leeds-Bradford, a cinema complex in the UK
Odeon Star, a cinema in the Adelaide suburb of Semaphore, South Australia